The 2023 Kuurne–Brussels–Kuurne was the 75th edition of the Kuurne–Brussels–Kuurne cycling classic. It was held on 26 February 2023 as a category 1.Pro race on the 2023 UCI ProSeries.

Teams 
All UCI WorldTeams along with seven UCI ProTeams formed the twenty-five teams that participated in the race. 96 riders finished the race.

UCI WorldTeams

 
 
 
 
 
 
 
 
 
 
 
 
 
 
 
 
 
 

UCI ProTeams

Result

References

External links 

2022
Kuurne–Brussels–Kuurne
Kuurne–Brussels–Kuurne
Kuurne–Brussels–Kuurne